The Layer monument is an early 17th-century polychrome marble mural monument (320 × 350 cm) erected in the memory of the lawyer Christopher Layer (1531–1600), and located in the Church of Saint John the Baptist, Norwich.

Inscription
Its inscription is in Latin, and reads in translation:

Interpretation
The monument is notable on two accounts, firstly, its four figurines housed in its two columns, Pax and Gloria, Vanitas and Labor, are relatively rare examples of Northern Mannerist sculpture extant in Britain; secondly, these four figurines exemplify how, during the era of Elizabeth I, Christian iconography occasionally integrated symbolism which originated from the western esoteric traditions of alchemy and astrology into works of art, including funerary monuments.

The Layer Quaternity 

The four figurines of The Layer Quaternity share a number of iconographical details with those found in an illustration in Alchemia (1606) by the German academic Andreas Libavius in its chapter entitled De Lapide Philosophorum (The Philosophers' Stone). These include - an identical pairing of a lower, mortal pair with an immortal pair, a bare-legged male with a draped female above, the titulary captions of Gloria and Labor, a palm branch, the sun and moon, and a rotundum.

Symbolically, the Layer Quaternity correspond to the alchemical "deities" of Apollo, Luna, Mercurius and Vulcan as named in Atalanta Fugiens (1617) by the German alchemist-physician Michael Maier (Emblem XVII).

Collectively the Layer Quaternity are a unique alchemical mandala. Through polarized symbolism they delineate essential coordinates associated with Mandala art, namely Space (Heaven and Earth) and Time (Young and Old). Utilizing variety and multiplicity, key attributes of Northern Mannerist art, they also represent fundamental aspects of the human condition, namely, gender, youth and age, pleasure and suffering. A fifth, uniting symbol, a skull, is located at the very centre of the monument. The skull is the commonest of all memento mori symbols in funerary art. It was also defined as the philosophical vessel (Vas Philosophorum) in Renaissance-era alchemy.
 
The role of the Quaternity in religious symbolism is discussed in depth in the writings of the Swiss psychologist Carl Gustav Jung. In essence, the Layer monument's four figurines represent spiritual entities which agree with Jung's analytical psychology, that the psyche moves toward individuation in fours (made up of pairs of opposites).

See also 
Northern Mannerism

References

External links
 

1600s sculptures
Sculptures in England
Funerary art
Buildings and structures in Norwich
Hermeticism
Luna (goddess)
Marble sculptures in the United Kingdom
Apollo in art
Mercury (mythology)